The 8th Annual MTV Millennial Awards took place on July 13, 2021 at the Quarry Studios in Mexico City. It was broadcast live by MTV Latin America. The awards celebrated the best of Latin music and the digital world of the millennial generation. The list of nominees were revealed on June 7, 2021. Leading the list of nominees was Karol G with six nominations, followed by Bad Bunny y Danna Paola with five each.

Performances
The performers were announced via the official MTV Miaw website.

Winners and nominees
Nominees were announced on June 7, 2021. Winners are listed in bold.

Music

Entertainment

Digital World

References

2021 television awards
2021 music awards
2021 in Latin music
2021 in Mexico